Kavaklı formerly the Greek town of Καβακλή Kavakli is a belde (town) in the central district (Kırklareli) of  Kırklareli Province, Turkey. The population of Kavaklı is   3445 as of 2011. Prior to Balkan Wars, the population of Kavaklı was composed of Greeks and Bulgarians living in the Ottoman Empire. After the Balkan Wars, Bulgarians left for Kavakli in Bulgaria, the Greeks were scattered throughout Greece, and the Turks from Bulgaria settled in Kavakli. Later, Turks from Greece and Serbia also settled in Kavakli. In 1968, Kavaklı was declared a seat of township. Both agriculture and industry play a part in town economy.

References

Populated places in Kırklareli Province
Towns in Turkey
Kırklareli Central District